Highway 718 is a highway in the Canadian province of Saskatchewan. It runs from Highway 2 near Mossbank to Highway 610 near Bateman.

Highway 718 also connects with Highways 58 and 627.

See also 
Roads in Saskatchewan
Transportation in Saskatchewan

References 

718